Ush ( Uš, possibly read Ninta) was King or ensi of Umma, a city-state in Sumer, circa 2450 BCE.

Ush is mentioned in various inscriptions, such as the Cone of Entemana as having violated the frontier with Lagash, a frontier which had been solemnly established by king Mesilim.

According to Enmetena's account, Ush is the one who invaded the territory of Lagash, and his invasion was then repelled, although the name of the ruler of Lagash who confronted him that time is not mentioned explicitly:

It is thought that Ush was severely defeated by Eannatum, king of Lagash. The victory of Eannatum is mentioned in a fragmentary inscription on the stele, suggesting that after the loss of 3,600 soldiers on the field, Ush, king of Umma, was killed in a rebellion in his capital city of Umma:

Eannatum, king of Lagash, later made a boundary treaty with Enakalle, successor of Ush, settling the matter, as described in the Cone of Entemana.

See also
 List of Mesopotamian dynasties

References

Kings of Umma
25th-century BC Sumerian kings
25th-century BC murdered monarchs